Bader Alhomoud (Arabic: بدر الحمود) is a Saudi Arabian film director and screenwriter.

Career 
Alhomoud started directing films in 2008. He directed the film  The Bliss of Being No One, which won many awards including Best Muhr Gulf Short at Dubai International Film Festival, the Special Jury Prize at the Beirut International Film Festival and  Best Script award at Saudi Film Festival. The film has been screened in numerous festivals such as the Gulf Film Festival, Dubai International Film Festival , Abu Dhabi Film Festival and has won other awards. His film Monopoly, which discusses the housing situation in Saudi Arabia, has made an effective social impact on YouTube.

Selected filmography 
 White & White (2008)
 Shorood (2009)
 Daken (2010)
 Monopoly (2011)
 Karwah (2012)
 Book of Sand (2013)
 Pen of Mirrors (2014)
 Scrap (2015)
 The Bliss of Being No One (2017)

References 
The information in this article is based on that in its Arabic equivalent.

Living people
Saudi Arabian film directors
1985 births